Talal Majrashi (born 10 September 1990) is a professional footballer who plays as winger for Al-Sahel.

Career
Majrashi started his career at the youth teams of Al-Ettifaq before joining Al-Khaleej. During the 2013–14 season, Majrashi helped Al-Khaleej reached promotion to the Pro League. Following the club's relegation to the First Division during the 2016–17 season, Majrashi left the club. On 4 June 2017, Majrashi joined newly-promoted side Al-Fayha. On 21 January 2018, Majrashi returned to Al-Ettifaq, but this time on loan from Al-Fayha. On 8 June 2018, he joined Ohod on loan. The loan was cut short on 11 December 2018. On 1 January 2019, Majrashi joined First Division side Al-Ain. His loan was renewed on 17 June 2019. During the 2019–20 season, Majrashi helped Al-Ain earn promotion to the Pro League for the first time in history. Majrashi returned to Al-Fayha during the 2020–21 season and helped reach promotion to the Pro League. On 7 June 2021, Majrashi joined Damac; however, he left the club without making a single appearance. On 27 August 2021, Majrashi joined First Division side Al-Qadsiah. On 3 January 2022, Majrashi joined Second Division side Al-Taraji. On 9 June 2022, Majrashi joined First Division side Al-Sahel.

Honours
Al-Khaleej 
First Division/MS League runner-up: 2013–14 (promotion to the Pro League)

Al-Ain
First Division/MS League third place: 2019–20 (promotion to the Pro League)

Al-Fayha
First Division/MS League runner-up: 2020–21 (promotion to the Pro League)

References 

1990 births
Living people
Saudi Arabian footballers
People from Dammam
Ettifaq FC players
Khaleej FC players
Al-Fayha FC players
Ohod Club players
Al-Ain FC (Saudi Arabia) players
Damac FC players
Al-Qadsiah FC players
Al-Taraji Club players
Al-Sahel SC (Saudi Arabia) players
Saudi First Division League players
Saudi Professional League players
Saudi Second Division players
Association football wingers